Javed Hayat (born 25 November 1964) is a Pakistani former cricketer. He played 153 first-class and 108 List A matches for several domestic teams in Pakistan between 1984 and 2005.

See also
 List of Pakistan Automobiles Corporation cricketers

References

External links
 

1964 births
Living people
Pakistani cricketers
Lahore cricketers
Pakistan Automobiles Corporation cricketers
Rawalpindi cricketers
Water and Power Development Authority cricketers
Zarai Taraqiati Bank Limited cricketers
Cricketers from Lahore